Howellton is a ghost town located in the Omineca Country region of British Columbia, Canada. The town is situated near Manson Creek and Dunkeld.

References

Ghost towns in British Columbia